Reckong Peo, also spelled Rekong Peo or simply known as Peo by the local inhabitants, is headquarters of Kinnaur district, one of the twelve administrative districts of the Indian state of Himachal Pradesh.

At a height of 2,290 metres (7,513 ft), Reckong Peo is 260 kilometers (162 miles) from Shimla and seven kilometers (4⅓ miles) from Powari ― a place on NH5. Earlier Kalpa was the headquarter of the Kinnaur district administration. It was later shifted down to Reckong Peo. The place is named after a group of people who used to own this place in ancient times.

Reckong Peo serves as a base for the pilgrims who go for an annual three days trek to an 80 feet high holy rock pillar that is considered to be as Lord Shiv or ‘Shivalinga’. Whereas a clockwise ‘Parikrama’ (circumambulation) trek around the holy rock start from Charang village and end at Chitkul after traversing a long and challenging terrain.

Reckong Peo is also the commercial and administrative center of the Kinnaur district as the biggest market of the entire district is located here and all important governmental as well as administrative offices are located at Reckong Peo. Tourists can take buses to visit all the important villages and other places of the district from the HRTC Bus Stand at Reckong Peo.

Places Of Interest
Bodh Mandir (Buddhist Temple) 
Durga Mata Temple, Kothi. 
Telangi view point.
Dakho view point. 
Khawangi Temple. 

The primary attractions of Recong Peo are the Chandi Mata Temple and Bhabha Valley. Apart from Kinnaur Kailash high mountain peak, you can also observe the high mountain peak of Raldang located in Greater Himalayas.

Apple orchards are found in abundance due to favorable climatic conditions. Houses are built traditionally that depict the culture and lifestyle of Himachal Pradesh.

The nearest airport is Kullu Manali Airport, 245 km from Reckong Peo by road.

Gallery

References

External links 
 Fresh spell of snowfall and light showers in the upper reaches of the hill state
 Info on Reckong Peo from Government of India portal

Cities and towns in Kinnaur district
Tourism in Himachal Pradesh